The 1986 Philippine Basketball Association (PBA) Reinforced Conference was the first conference of the 1986 PBA season. It started on April 6 and ended on June 17, 1986. The tournament requires two import each per team with both standing 6"3 and below.

Format
The following format will be observed for the duration of the conference:
 Double-round robin eliminations; 10 games per team; Teams are then seeded by basis on win–loss records.
 Team with the worst record after the elimination round will be eliminated.
 Semifinals will be two round robin affairs with the five remaining teams. Results from the elimination round will be carried over.
 The top two teams in the semifinals advance to the best-of-seven finals. The last two teams dispute the third-place trophy in a best-of-seven playoff.

Imports
Each team were allowed two imports. The first line in the table are the original reinforcements of the teams. Below the name are the replacement of the import above. Same with the third replacement that is also highlighted with a different color. GP is the number of games played.

Elimination round

Semifinals

Third place playoffs

Finals

References

PBA Reinforced Conference
Reinforced Conference